The Hungarian Union (UM) was a political party in Romania representing the Hungarian minority.

History
The party was established on 6 July 1921, with Sámuel Jósika as its first president. Its activities were suspended by the Romanian government on 30 October, based on a historical law banning political parties based on ethnic lines. On 15 January 1922 István Kecskeméthy became its new president, and the government allowed the party to resume activities shortly before the March 1922 elections.

In the elections the party won three seats in the Chamber of Deputies. However, it was banned against shortly after the election. On 20 November it was agreed to merge with the Transylvanian People’s Party to form the new Magyar Party.

Electoral history

Legislative elections

References

Defunct political parties in Romania
Political parties established in 1921
Political parties disestablished in 1922
1921 establishments in Romania
1922 disestablishments in Romania
Hungarian political parties in Romania